Northern Alliance can mean any of the following:

 The Northern Alliance, a regional network of political activists that originated in the Lombardy, Lega Nord
 The Afghan Northern Alliance, a military-political umbrella organization in Afghanistan
The National Resistance Front of Afghanistan also known as the Panjshir resistance, commonly considered to be the modern Northern Alliance
 The Northern Alliance (Myanmar), a coalition of ethnic insurgent groups in Myanmar
 The Northern Alliance Radio Network, an American radio talk show hosted by bloggers in Minneapolis and Saint Paul, Minnesota
 Northern Football Alliance, an English football competition
 Nordallianz: a group of German towns situated between the city of Munich and Munich Airport
 The Ōuetsu Reppan Dōmei, sometimes referred to in English as the Northern Alliance, a short-lived Japanese military-political coalition during the Boshin War
 The National Farmers' Alliance, a US Farmers' Alliance
 The Anti-Swedish alliance, during the Great Northern War, led by Denmark–Norway, Tsardom of Russia and Electorate of Saxony